José Antonio Collado Herrera (born 24 March 1990) is a Spanish professional footballer who plays as a striker.

Club career
Born in Las Palmas, Canary Islands, Collado played for three clubs as a youth, including Villarreal CF. His first season as a senior was 2009–10, when he was loaned by the Valencians to Gimnástica de Torrelavega in the Segunda División B, eventually finishing as joint-eighth top scorer in group II with 14 goals.

On 18 June 2010, Collado signed a four-year contract for S.C. Braga in Portugal as a free agent. He returned to his country shortly after, however, spending the vast majority of the following two seasons on loan to Atlético Madrid B also in the third tier.

Collado was loaned to CD Guadalajara of the Segunda División in the 2012 January transfer window. He made his professional debut on the 28th, coming on as a second-half substitute in the home fixture against CD Numancia and scoring the game's only goal.

Released in June 2013, Collado went on to spend the rest of his career in the Spanish lower leagues.

References

External links

1990 births
Living people
Spanish footballers
Footballers from Las Palmas
Association football forwards
Segunda División players
Segunda División B players
Tercera División players
Villarreal CF players
Gimnástica de Torrelavega footballers
Atlético Madrid B players
CD Guadalajara (Spain) footballers
Rayo Vallecano B players
Villarreal CF C players
UD Las Palmas Atlético players
CE L'Hospitalet players
CP Cacereño players
S.C. Braga players
S.C. Braga B players
Spanish expatriate footballers
Expatriate footballers in Portugal
Spanish expatriate sportspeople in Portugal